Başkışla is a village in Turkey

Its distance to Karaman is .Its population was 425 as of 2014.

The village was founded in the 16th century as a Turkmen village. During the winters the village was used as the winter quarters for the travellers between Karaman and the mountain villages. In Turkish such places were called kışlak and the village was named Başkışlak. Later the last -k was dropped and the present name of the village is Başkışla.

Agriculture and animal husbandry are the chief sources of income in the village. Barley wheat and chickpea are main crops. Viticulture, poultry and sheep breeding are other economic activities.

References

Villages in Karaman Central District